() is a county of Zhejiang Province, East China, it is under the administration of the prefecture-level city of Hangzhou, the capital of Zhejiang, containing the well-known Qiandao Lake and bordering Anhui province to the northwest. The postal code is 311700, and the county seat is located on 18 North Xin'an Rd., Qiandaohu Town.

Administrative divisions
Chun'an consists of 12 towns, 18 townships, eight districts, five resident districts and 889 administrative villages.

Towns: Qiandaohu, Linqi, Weiping, Jiangjia, Fenkou, Shilin, Dashu, Tangcun, Zitong, Zhongzhou, Wenchang, Fengshuling.
Townships: Lishang, Pingmen, Langchuan, Anyang, Wangbu, Guocun, Jinfeng, Yaoshan, Guangchang, Songcun, Jiuken, Yanjia, Baima, Zuokou, Wangzhai, Fuwen, Hengyan and Jieshou.

Climate

See also
 Qiandao Lake
 Hangzhou Qiandaohu

References 

 
Geography of Hangzhou
County-level divisions of Zhejiang